José Moreno Gans (Algemesi, 1897-1976) was a Spanish composer. He was primarily a regional composer, with his works being performed in his native Valencia.

Works
Algemesienses for piano
Tres canciones del mar

References

1897 births
1976 deaths
Spanish composers
Spanish male composers
People from Valencia
20th-century composers
20th-century Spanish musicians
20th-century Spanish male musicians